TVF Tripling is an Indian Hindi-language web series created by The Viral Fever. It was developed by Sameer Saxena and written by Akarsh Khurana and Sumeet Vyas. The series star Vyas, Maanvi Gagroo and Amol Parashar in lead roles, along with Kunaal Roy Kapur, Nidhi Bisht, Kumud Mishra, and Shernaz Patel. It traces the story of three siblings, who together start a hilarious journey to find themselves and their relations. The first season has music and background score composed by Amar Mangrulkar, with cinematography and editing done by G. Srinivas Reddy, Anand Subbaiya and Tamojit Das respectively.

TVF Tripling: Season 1 was premiered simultaneously in the company's media streaming platform TVF Play and in YouTube, from 7 September 2016 to 7 October, with five consecutive episodes were aired every week. The show received positive response from audience and along with some other contributions, the series has won several awards, including the Asian Television Award. It was recognised as one of the best web-series of 2016 and also a benchmark of success in Indian branded content and has since developed a cult status.

Following the success of TVF Tripling, the makers renewed for a second season with Sameer Saxena directing the series, and retaining the same technical crew, with the exception of music composer Mangrulkar, who worked in the first season, as he was replaced by Nilotpal Bora, whereas the cinematographer and editors were same. The series aired through Sony Liv on 5 April 2019, and unlike that of the first season, it received mixed reviews from critics.

The show was renewed for a third season in 2021 and moved to ZEE5 as the streaming platform. The third season premiered on October 21, 2022. The season is written by Sumeet Vyas and directed by Neeraj Udhwani. In this season the three siblings find out that their parents are getting a divorce. It received positive reviews from critics.

Cast

Series overview

Episodes

Season 1

Season 2

Season 3

Soundtrack 
For the soundtrack album of TVF Tripling: Season 1, Rajesh Krishnan chose Amar Mangrulkar, who earlier composed background music for the 2014 film Hasee Toh Phasee to work on the series. This marked Mangrulkar's maiden collaboration with The Viral Fever, as the company previously collaborated with Vaibhav Bundhoo for Permanent Roommates and TVF Pitchers. The soundtrack album consists of 13 songs which was composed, produced and programmed by Mangrulkar, who also wrote lyrics for the songs along with the series' director Krishnan, Kapil Sawant, Vaibhav Modi, Rajnigandha Shekhawat and Jaspreet Jasz. It also features a traditional folk song "Kesariya Balam" which is based on Rajasthani music and "Amma Puchchadi" which is originated from Himachali music.

For the second season of TVF Tripling, The Viral Fever associated with Sony Music India in their maiden collaboration, and Mangrulkar was eventually replaced by Nilotpal Bora as the composer. The eight-song soundtrack has lyrics written by Hussain Haidry, Rahul Dey Das and Varun Likhate. Arup Jyoti Barua composed one song "Mon Chole Re" based on a poem written by Rahul Dey Das, which had two versions in the original soundtrack album. Bora recreated the song "Mada Faqa" from the first season composed by Mangrulkar and titled it as "Mada Faqa 2.0". The song had rap versions crooned, written and additionally composed by Varun Likhate.

Track listing

Release 
The Viral Fever released the first trailer of the series on 25 August 2016. As a part of the promotional purpose, TVF partnered with Tata Motors for the project to promote the newly launched Tata Tiago. The first season of TVF Tripling was scheduled to be released on 7 September 2016, with its first episode being released simultaneously through TVF's media streaming platform TVF Play, and also through its official YouTube channel. The season finale premiered on 7 October.

Following the success of the first season, The Viral Fever renewed for a second season of TVF Tripling, with the teaser and trailer eventually released on 7 and 15 March 2019, respectively. The digital rights of the second season was sold to SonyLIV and the series was released on 5 April 2019.

For the third season, the series moved to ZEE5. The teaser for the season was released on 3 October 2022.

Accolades

References

External links 
 
Tripling on ZEE5

Indian drama web series
YouTube original programming
2016 web series debuts
Hindi-language web series
TVF Play Shows
2010s YouTube series